Ratbane, or Rat's bane, may refer to one of the following:

 Arsenic trioxide, a poisonous substance
 Common wintergreen, Pyrola minor, also known as Rat's vein
 False hellebore, Veratrum viride
 Gifblaar, Dichapetalum cymosum
 Helleborine, Epipactis pubescens
 Pipsissewa plant, Chimaphila umbellata